Emil Soravuo (born 28 March 1997) is a Finnish artistic gymnast and the 2021 bronze medalist in floor exercise. In 2019, he won the gold medal in the men's floor exercise event at the 2019 European Games held in Minsk, Belarus.

In 2014, he represented Finland at the 2014 Summer Youth Olympics held in Nanjing, China without winning a medal.

In March 2017 he completed his military service at the Armed Forces Military School, where he trained in gymnastics in the evenings. "I actually did really well in the army. I got to keep myself fit there." 

In 2019, he competed in the men's floor event at the 2019 European Artistic Gymnastics Championships without winning a medal.

In 2021, he competed in the men's floor event at the 2021 World Artistic Gymnastics Championships and won the bronze medal.

References 

Living people
1997 births
Sportspeople from Espoo
Finnish male artistic gymnasts
Gymnasts at the 2019 European Games
European Games medalists in gymnastics
European Games gold medalists for Finland
Gymnasts at the 2014 Summer Youth Olympics
Medalists at the World Artistic Gymnastics Championships
21st-century Finnish people